John Skardon is an Australian former professional rugby league footballer who played in the 1990s.

Playing career
A Cairns Ivanhoes junior, Skardon represented Cairns in the Foley Shield competition before being signed by the Gold Coast Seagulls. 

In Round 1 of the 1993 NSWRL season, Skardon made his first grade debut in the Seagulls' 10–14 loss to the Western Suburbs Magpies. In 1994, he became a regular for the Gold Coast, playing 18 games and scoring six tries.

In 1995, Skardon joined the newly-established North Queensland Cowboys, starting on the wing in their inaugural match against the Sydney Bulldogs. He played 16 games for the club in their first season, moving to the hooker position halfway through the year. Over the next two seasons, Skardon played just six games for the Cowboys, before leaving at the end of the 1997 season.

Statistics

NSWRL/ARL/Super League

References

Living people
Australian rugby league players
Gold Coast Chargers players
North Queensland Cowboys players
Rugby league wingers
Rugby league centres
Rugby league five-eighths
Rugby league hookers
Year of birth missing (living people)
Rugby league players from Cairns